Robin Ramaekers (born 26 October 1994) is a Belgian competitive archer. He competed as a member of the Belgian archery squad in major international tournaments, spanning the World Championships, the 2015 European Games, and the 2016 Summer Olympics. Ramaekers currently trains at a local archery range in his native Tongeren, under the tutelage of his coach Francis Notenboom, a former Olympian from the 1988 edition.

At the 2016 Summer Olympics in Rio de Janeiro, Ramaekers became the first Belgian archer to compete in an Olympic tournament since 2000, shooting only in the men's individual recurve. First, he recorded a total score of 654 points, including 25 targets of a perfect ten, to seal the forty-second seed from a field of 64 archers in the classification round. Heading to the knockout stage on the third day of the Games, Ramaekers firmly disposed the hard-charging Australian Ryan Tyack at 6–2 in the opening round, before he dropped his subsequent match on three straight sets to the Spaniard and tenth-seeded archer Juan Ignacio Rodríguez.

References

External links
 
 
 
  (archive)
 

Belgian male archers
Living people
People from Tongeren
1994 births
Archers at the 2015 European Games
European Games competitors for Belgium
Olympic archers of Belgium
Archers at the 2016 Summer Olympics
Sportspeople from Limburg (Belgium)